Jordal is a neighbourhood in the borough of Gamle Oslo in Oslo, Norway.

The neighbourhood is in a small valley between Kampen and Vålerenga, on a portion of the land previously occupied by the Nedre Valle farm. The area then became part of the Aker municipality until 1878, when Aker was incorporated into Kristiania (renamed Oslo in 1925). Jordal  on the site now occupied by the Jordal Amfi, built as the venue for ice hockey at the 1952 Winter Olympics. The area is served by Ensjø station on the Oslo Metro.

See also
Jordal Idrettspark
Jordal IF - a defunct sports club that used the Jordal facilities 
Vålerengens IF - a sports club that uses the Jordal facilities

References

External links

Neighbourhoods of Oslo
Gamle Oslo